The Daily Slovak News (also known as TheDaily SK) is an English online newspaper headquartered in Bratislava, Slovakia.

Profile
The Daily covers current affairs, politics, business, legislation, foreign affairs, sport and culture. The editor-in-chief of the daily is John Boyd and Tony Papaleo is his deputy. The daily has the motto "your independent English news for Slovakia."

References

External links
Official website

Slovakian news websites
English-language newspapers published in Europe
Mass media in Bratislava
Newspapers published in Slovakia
Publications with year of establishment missing